Stephanie S. Cooke is a journalist who began her reporting career in 1977 at the Associated Press. In 1980 she moved to McGraw-Hill in New York as a reporter for Nucleonics Week, NuclearFuel and Inside N.R.C. In 1984 she transferred to London and two years later covered the aftermath of the Chernobyl disaster for Business Week and Nucleonics Week. In 2004, Cooke returned to the United States to complete her book In Mortal Hands: A Cautionary History of the Nuclear Age. Cooke lives with her son in Kensington, Maryland, and is currently editor of Nuclear Intelligence Weekly.

References

External links
 Stephanie Cooke's blog
 A Nuclear Waste, Op-Ed by Stephanie Cooke in The New York Times, March 17, 2009.

American investigative journalists
Year of birth missing (living people)
Living people
People associated with nuclear power